The Career of Katherine Bush is a lost 1919 American silent drama film produced by Famous Players-Lasky and distributed by Paramount Pictures. Roy William Neill directed and Catherine Calvert starred. The film is based on a 1916 Elinor Glyn novel.

Plot
As described in a film magazine, Katherine Bush (Calvert), a young woman from London's lower middle class, yearns for the finer things in life and spends an illicit weekend with a certain Lord Algy (Goldsworthy) at a fashionable watering place. Returning home, she answers an advertisement that leads to a position as secretary to Lady Garrubardine (Brundage), a leader of London society. Lord Gerald Strobridge (Kent), Lady Garrubardine's unhappily married nephew, falls in love with Katherine but she only offers him friendship. Katherine rises in Lady Garrubardine's estimation until she is almost an equal in the household. Then comes the Duke of Mordryn (Burton), a statesman who falls in love with Katherine, believing she is of his class. Learning the truth of her station, he continues his attentions and finally proposes. Katherine then tells him of her one misstep. He leaves her at once. Then Lord Gerald leaves for India, and Katherine believes the end of her dream of happiness has come. Lady Garrubardine, however, intervenes in her behalf, and the Duke comes to her, forgiving, and they are married.

Starring
Catherine Calvert as Katherine Bush
John Goldsworthy as Lord Algernon Fitz-Rufus
Crauford Kent as Lord Gerald Strobridge
Mathilde Brundage as Lady Garrubardine (credited as Mrs. Mathilde Brundage)
Helen Montrose as Lao Belemar
Anne Dearing as Gladys Bush (credited as Ann Dearing)
Augusta Anderson as Matilda Bush
Nora Reed as Slavey (credited as Norah Reed)
Claire Whitney as Lady Beatrice Strobridge
Albert Hackett as Bert Bush
Earl Lockwood as Fred Bush
Walter Smith as Bob Hartley
Robert Minot as Charlie Prodgers
Edith Pierce as Ethel Bush
Allan Simpson as Lao's Sweetheart (credited as Allen Simpson)
Frederick Burton as Duke of Mordryn (credited as Fred Burton)

References

External links

Lantern slide(archived)
Glyn, Elinor (1916), The Career of Katherine Bush, New York: Grosset & Dunlap, on the Internet Archive

1919 films
American silent feature films
Lost American films
Films based on British novels
Films directed by Roy William Neill
Paramount Pictures films
1919 drama films
Silent American drama films
American black-and-white films
1919 lost films
Lost drama films
1910s American films